Colonel Lionel Augustus Grimston  (18 April 1869 – 12 November 1943) was an Indian Defence Force officer.

Life 
He was the son of Colonel Oswald J. A. Grimston and was educated at Bloxham School and the United Services College.

He was commissioned into the Indian Volunteers in December 1893 and served with the 6th Assam Valley Light Horse of the Auxiliary Force, India.

Grimston was promoted lieutenant colonel in February 1913 and commanded the Assam Light Horse during the First World War from 1 April 1916. He retired in 1921.

He was invested as an Officer of the Order of the British Empire (Military Division) in recognition of distinguished services rendered in India in connection with the War in the London Gazette 12 September 1919. He had already received the Volunteer Officers' Decoration.

His name was brought to the notice of the Secretary of State for War for valuable services rendered in India in connection with the War.

On 1 January 1921 was invested as a Companion of the Order of the Indian Empire.

He returned to England upon retirement and lived in Willingdon, East Sussex.

References

1868 births
1943 deaths
Indian Defence Force officers
Companions of the Order of the Indian Empire
Officers of the Order of the British Empire
People educated at Bloxham School
People educated at United Services College
People from Willingdon